"You Keep Running Away" is a Holland-Dozier-Holland composition originally recorded in 1967 by the Four Tops.  The song appears on their 1971 LP Four Tops Greatest Hits Vol. 2.  
Billboard described the single as a "solid easy heat rocker that moves from start to finish has all the ingredients for another chart topper."

Background
As in many of their other songs, the Andantes augmented the  background vocals. This was one of the last few HDH releases by the Four Tops.

Chart history
"You Keep Running Away" went to number seven on the R&B charts and number nineteen on the Hot 100.

References

Four Tops songs
1967 songs
Motown singles
Songs written by Holland–Dozier–Holland
Song recordings produced by Brian Holland
Song recordings produced by Lamont Dozier
1967 singles